Colleen Higgs (born 1962 in Kimberley, South Africa) is a South African writer and publisher. As a writer, she has published poems and stories in literary magazines in South Africa since 1990. As a publisher, she is both renowned and respected as the founder of independent publishing house, Modjaji Books.

Background
Higgs spent most of her childhood in Lesotho, her adolescence and young adulthood in Johannesburg, and more recently lived for five years in Grahamstown. She now lives in Sybrand Park, Cape Town. She has worked as a teacher, a teacher trainer, a materials writer and an academic development lecturer, and programme manager at The Centre for the Book. She is the founder and publisher of Modjaji Books, an independent publishing house based in Cape Town, publishing books written exclusively by women. Currently, Modjaji publishes short stories, memoir, novels, poetry, and creative non-fiction: their publication Whiplash by Tracey Farren was short-listed for the 2009 Sunday Times Fiction award.

Higgs is also a writer whose poems have been published in literary magazines since 1990. Her debut poetry collection, Halfborn Woman, was published in 2004.

Her blog (on BooksLive) is frequently updated and features reviews, news, articles and insights on South African publishing. In 2020 her memoir My Mother, My Madness was published.

Works
 Halfborn Woman (2004), Hands-On Books collection of poems
 A Rough Guide to Small-scale and Self-publishing (2005), Centre for the Book
 South African Small Publishers' Catalogue (editor with Maire Fisher) (2006), Centre for the Book
 Small Publishers' Catalogue - Africa, 2010 (2010) (editor with Bontle Senne)
 Lava Lamp Poems (2011), Hands-On Books, collection of poems
 Looking for Trouble: mostly Yeoville stories (2012), Hands-On Books, collection of stories
 Small Publishers' Catalogue - Africa, 2013 (2013)
 My Mother, My Madness (2020), Deep South

References

Living people
1962 births
South African women poets
South African publishers (people)
South African women short story writers
South African short story writers